This is a list of public art in the Lincolnshire county of England. This list applies only to works of public art on permanent display in an outdoor public space. For example, this does not include artworks in museums.

References 

Lincolnshire
Culture in Lincolnshire
Lists of buildings and structures in Lincolnshire